Out of Here may refer to:

Out of Here (Departure Lounge album), 2000
Out of Here (Corduroy album), 1994
"Out of Here", a song on The Soup Dragons album Hydrophonic

See also
Outta Here, a 2009 album by Esmée Denters
Outta Here (Esmée Denters song)
Outta Here (Laura Tesoro song)